Dominique Knüppel Artagaveytia (born 11 July 1993) is a Uruguayan sailor.

She represented Uruguay at the 2020 Summer Olympics, ranking 18th in the mixed Nacra 17 event alongside Pablo Defazio Abella. Her father Bernd competed in the 1984 Los Angeles Summer Olympics and at the 1988 Summer Olympics in Seoul.

Notes

References

External links 
 
 
 

1993 births
Living people
Uruguayan female sailors (sport)
Olympic sailors of Uruguay
Sailors at the 2020 Summer Olympics – Nacra 17
Uruguayan people of German descent